Paradigm is a comic book series by Matthew Cashel and Jeremy Haun.

Publication history
After its initial publication run with Two Irish Guys Press, it was licensed by Image Comics. Following issue #12 the series went on hiatus.

Collected editions
The series is being collected into trade paperbacks:

Segue To An Interlude (collects Paradigm #1–4, 156 pages, October 2003)

Notes

References

External links
 Paradigm #1 review, Movie Poop Shoot – Breakdowns, Quick Stop Entertainment
 Paradigm #1 review, The Pitch
 Paradigm #1 review, First Impressions, Pop Image
 Paradigm #1 review at The X-Axis
 Paradigm #2 review, Ain't It Cool News
 Paradigm #2 review, Movie Poop Shoot – Breakdowns, Quick Stop Entertainment
 Paradigm #2 review, The Fourth Rail

2002 comics debuts
Image Comics titles